Jan Schubart (26 February 1924 – 10 May 2010) was a Dutch boxer. He competed in the men's middleweight event at the 1948 Summer Olympics.

References

1924 births
2010 deaths
Dutch male boxers
Olympic boxers of the Netherlands
Boxers at the 1948 Summer Olympics
Sportspeople from Groningen (city)
Middleweight boxers